Tottington Wood is a   Local Nature Reserve in Small Dole in West Sussex. It is owned by Hopegar Properties and managed by The Tottington Woodlanders.

This semi-ancient wood is recorded back to 1600 and it has an oak tree which is over 250 years old. Mammals include roe deer and bats and there are birds such as woodpeckers and blue tits.

There is access by a footpath from Henfield Road.

References

Local Nature Reserves in West Sussex
Forests and woodlands of West Sussex